¡Qué buena se puso Lola! (How hot Lola got!) is a Venezuelan telenovela written by José Manuel Peláez and produced by RCTV. It starred Roxana Díaz and Jerónimo Gil, and with the participation of Flavia Gleske antagonistic.

Plot 
Dolores Santos Estrella is a simple and devoted nurse working in a modest clinic. Jorge Avellaneda is the best surgeon cosmetic main center of the country. Both have lifestyles very different tastes and opinions. However, fate will unite in marriage shortly after they met. Motivated by his perfectionist spirit, want to make it an ideal beauty and unable to convince her to operate, lied and tricked into surgery leads up into an almost perfect woman, as if he were Dr. Frankenstein. She betrayed and transfigured now fight to reclaim their dreams making Jorge, now hopelessly in love with her, not left him nothing to fight to regain his love, just as everyone says: "¡Qué buena se puso Lola!".

Cast 

 Roxana Díaz Burgos as Dolores Estrella Santo
 Jerónimo Gil as Jorge Benavides Avellaneda
 Emma Rabbe as Argelia Leon
 Carlos Olivier as Fernando Estrada
 Roberto Mesutti as Oscar Aguirre
 Flavia Gleske as Dora Fabiana Estrada
 Leonardo Marrero as Amilcar Rincón
 Nacarid Escalona as Luisita Paz
 Sebastián Falco as Celedonio
 Carlos Guillermo Haydon as Julio Bravo
 Amanda Gutiérrez as Casta Benavides
 Juan Carlos Gardié as Romero Santos
 Rosario Prieto as Luz Elena Aguirre
 Luis Gerardo Núñez as Max Rodriguez
 Francis Rueda as Pura Avellaneda
 Haydee Balza as Denisse de la Iglesia
 Gioia Lombardini as Beatriz
 Raquel Castaños  as Elisa Gonzalez de Santos
 Deyalit López as Xiomara Caballero
 Jesus Cervo as Fidias
 Manuel "Coko" Sosa as Romerito Santos
 Susej Vera as Amanda
 Yelena Maciel as Anita
 Lady Dayana Nuñez as Candida Santos
 Emerson Rondon as El Sapo
 Aracelli Prieto as Doña Flor
 Enrique Izquierdo as Comisario Ibarra
 Christian Bronstein as Ender Corredor
 Nathan Bronstein as Efren Corredor
 Ángela Hernández as Sabina
 Christina Dieckmann as Beauty Gift
 Wanda D'Isidoro as Mary Poppins

References

External links 
 

RCTV telenovelas
2004 telenovelas
Venezuelan telenovelas
2004 Venezuelan television series debuts
2004 Venezuelan television series endings
Spanish-language telenovelas
Television shows set in Caracas